Francisco Picasso Risso (born 19 June 1982) is an Olympic and national-record holding swimmer from Uruguay. He swam for Uruguay at the 2000 and 2008 Olympics.

He has swum for Uruguay at:
Olympics: 2000 and 2008
World Championships: 2003, 2005, 2007
Pan American Games: 1999, 2003, and 2007

At the 2000 Olympics, he swam the 200 Individual Medley. At the 2008 Olympics he swam the 50 freestyle.

References

External links
 Terra

1982 births
Living people
Olympic swimmers of Uruguay
Male medley swimmers
Swimmers at the 2000 Summer Olympics
Swimmers at the 2008 Summer Olympics
Swimmers at the 1999 Pan American Games
Swimmers at the 2003 Pan American Games
Swimmers at the 2007 Pan American Games
Pan American Games competitors for Uruguay
Sportspeople from Montevideo
Uruguayan male swimmers
Texas A&M Aggies men's swimmers
20th-century Uruguayan people
21st-century Uruguayan people